Paris is a census-designated place and unincorporated community in Lafayette County, Mississippi, United States.

It was first named as a CDP in the 2020 Census which listed a population of 163.

Demographics

2020 census

Note: the US Census treats Hispanic/Latino as an ethnic category. This table excludes Latinos from the racial categories and assigns them to a separate category. Hispanics/Latinos can be of any race.

Education
It is in the Lafayette County School District.

Notable person
Theora Hamblett, Mississippi artist, was born in Paris.

References

Unincorporated communities in Lafayette County, Mississippi
Unincorporated communities in Mississippi
Census-designated places in Lafayette County, Mississippi